West Sussex County Council in England is elected every four years.

Political control
Since 1973 political control of the council has been held by the following parties:

Leadership
The leaders of the council since 1993 have been:

Council elections
1997 West Sussex County Council election
2001 West Sussex County Council election
2005 West Sussex County Council election (boundary changes reduced the number of seats by 1)
2009 West Sussex County Council election
2013 West Sussex County Council election
2017 West Sussex County Council election
2021 West Sussex County Council election

By-election results

1993-1997

1997-2001

2001-2005

2005-2009

2009-2013

2013-2017

2017-2021

References

By-election results

External links
West Sussex County Council

 
Politics of West Sussex
Council elections in West Sussex
County council elections in England